Andrew Chiu Ka-yin (born 17 July 1985) is a Hong Kong politician, democracy activist, experienced accredited mediator and arbitrator. He is a member of the Democratic Party, strategy committee member of the Professional Commons, chairperson of Hong Kong Society of Accredited Mediators and convenor of Power for Democracy, as well as an elected member of the Eastern District Council for Tai Koo Shing West since 2008.

Biography
He was born and educated in Hong Kong, graduated with a Bachelor of Social Sciences from the Open University of Hong Kong and a master's degree in Public Administration from Hong Kong Baptist University. In 2017, he was conferred an honorary doctorate degree in Public Administration from SABI University, an online private higher education institute registered under French Government's 'Ministry of Higher Education, Research and Innovation', in recognition of his contributions and commitments to public sector over a decade, including the fact that Chiu was the youngest elected representative in 2007 Hong Kong local elections (22 years old).

Chiu joined the Democratic Party in 2004 and was first elected to the Eastern District Council in Tai Koo Shing West in 2007 and was re-elected in 2011 and 2015. He was also a central committee member of the Democratic Party from 2010 to 2014. He was on the Democratic Party ticket in the 2012 Legislative Council election in District Council (Second). The ticket received 316,468 votes and successfully secured a seat for James To.

In 2014, he succeeded Joseph Cheng Yu-shek to become the convenor of the Power for Democracy, a mediating platform for electoral coordination between the pro-democratic parties. During his tenure as convenor, the group coordinated several mock polls and primaries for the pro-democrats, including the 2015 District Council election and the primaries for March 2018 Legislative Council by-elections.

Chiu was elected vice-president of the Eastern District Council in 2020.

On 6 January 2021, Chiu was among 55 members of the pro-democratic camp who were arrested under the national security law, specifically its provision regarding subversion. The group stood accused of organising and participating in unofficial primary elections held by the camp in July 2020. Like most of the group, Chiu was released on bail on 7 January.

After he was charged, Chiu decided to resign as a member and Vice-Chairman of Eastern District Council, effective on 9 July 2021.

Tai Koo Shing attack

On 3 November 2019, during a protest at Cityplaza, Tai Koo Shing, Chiu was attacked by a pro-Beijing, Mandarin-speaking, knife-wielding man, when he tried to stop a fight after the attacker assaulted several people. His left ear was partially bitten off by the attacker. Doctors made an unsuccessful attempt to reattach the ear. Chiu later said, “I am worried there will be more casualties and I urge residents and young people to protect themselves. They cannot underestimate the violence and fierceness of the regime.”

References

External links 
 

1985 births
Living people
Alumni of Hong Kong Metropolitan University
Alumni of Hong Kong Baptist University
District councillors of Eastern District
Democratic Party (Hong Kong) politicians
Hong Kong political prisoners